Gilberto Magalhães Occhi (born 24 July 1958) is a Brazilian lawyer and politician member of the Progressistas (PP). He was Minister of Cities and of National Integration during the government of president Dilma Rousseff.

On 1 June 2016, then acting president Michel Temer nominated Occhi president of the Brazilian public bank Caixa Econômica Federal. Occhi left the presidency of the bank after he was nominated Minister of Health by president Temer, to substitute Ricardo Barros, who was running for reelection as federal deputy.

Biography
On 29 December 2014, he was confirmed as new Minister of National Integration of the second cabinet of Dilma Rousseff. On 13 April 2016, he resigned after his party, the Progressive Party, decided to support the impeachment of Dilma Rousseff.

In October 2017, the Minister of Finance Henrique Meirelles and Occhi discussed about Caixa's statute reform. The reunion had as main theme the approval of a new statute of the bank. The changes want to turn the bank administration more transparent and adapt the financial institution to the rules provided in the State Companies Law.

Yet in October 2017, Occhi was cited in the plea of the financial operator Lúcio Funaro to the Prosecutor-General of the Republic (PGR). In his testimony, Funaro defended that Gilberto Occhi had, at the time he was vice-president of Government of the financial institution, a "monthly goal" of bribes to "produce" and distribute to politicians of the Progressive Party. By his press advisor, Occhi informed that "[he] strongly deny" what was said by Lúcio Funaro about his person.

References

|-

|-

|-

1958 births
Living people
Government ministers of Brazil
Progressistas politicians
20th-century Brazilian lawyers
People from Ubá
Health ministers of Brazil